The 82nd World Science Fiction Convention (Worldcon), also known as Glasgow 2024, will be held in 2024 in Glasgow, United Kingdom.

Awards 

The awards will be announced at the convention.

Site selection 

The site of the convention was chosen by members of the 80th World Science Fiction Convention. Glasgow was the only bid.

See also 

 Hugo Award
 Science fiction
 Speculative fiction
 World Science Fiction Society
 Worldcon

References

External links 

 
 
 List of current Worldcon bids

2024 conferences
Science fiction conventions in Europe
Science fiction conventions in the United Kingdom
Worldcon